Kiri Laurelle Davis is an American filmmaker based in New York City. Her first documentary, A Girl Like Me (2005), made while enrolled at Reel Works Teen Filmmaking, received significant news coverage.

Kiri Davis' mother, an education consultant, raised her daughter to be proud of her African-American heritage. After completing her high school education two years after making her award-winning documentary, Davis was due to matriculate at Howard University, a historically black university in Washington DC for the fall 2007 semester.

When aged just 16 and a student at the Urban Academy, Davis became interested in Brown v. Board of Education, and also Kenneth and Mamie Clark's groundbreaking study of color preferences among young black children. She repeated the Clark study and asked children to choose between two dolls: a light-skinned one and a dark-skinned one. Fifteen out of the twenty-one children preferred the lighter-skinned doll when asked to pick "the nice doll." The documentary that resulted includes selections from her repeat study and interviews with friends who talk about the importance of color, hair quality, and facial features for young black women today in the United States.

Screenings
Tribeca Film Festival
The 6th Annual Media That Matters.
Silverdocs: AFI/Discovery Channel Documentary Festival
HBO

Awards
Winner of The Diversity Award at the 6th Annual Media That Matters film festival

Film appearances
Davis discusses A Girl Like Me in the 2008 film The Black Candle, directed by M. K. Asante, Jr. and narrated by Maya Angelou.

References

External links
Kiri Davis' Official Website
Kiri Davis Biography at  Media That Matters
New 'Doll Test' Produces Ugly Results, August 16, 2006 Baltimore Times.
African-American Images: The New Doll Test, October 2, 2006 on Talk of the Nation, NPR.

Video:
A Girl Like Me, Entire documentary on NAACP website with introductory text.  Accessed August 27, 2007.
A Girl Like Me: Background a discussion of making the documentary
"A Girl Like Me" segment, October 11, 2006 on Good Morning America, ABC.

African-American film directors
American film directors
American documentary filmmakers
Living people
Year of birth missing (living people)
21st-century African-American people